Volya may refer to:
Pavel Volya (born 1979), Russian television host, actor, and singer
Volya, from 1917–1918, name of the Russian battleship Imperator Aleksandr III, Imperatritsa Mariya-class dreadnought of the Imperial Russian Navy
Volya (Russian political party), a political party in Russia with a candidate in the 2013 Moscow mayoral election
Agrotown Volya, Brest Voblast, Belarus
Volya (Bulgarian political party), political party in Bulgaria run by Veselin Mareshki
Volya (Ukrainian political party), political party in Ukraine
Bluzhev-Volya, a branch of the Bluzhev Hasidic group

See also
Narodnaya Volya (disambiguation)